SS-77, SS 77  or SS77 may refer to:

 USS O-16 (SS-77), a United States Navy submarine which saw service during World War I
 Vektor SS-77, a machine gun manufactured by the South African company Denel Land Systems
 Texas State Highway Spur 77, a road in the State of Texas, United States